Pacific Telecom, Inc., originally Telephone Utilities, Inc. and now CenturyTel of the Northwest, Inc., was an independent telephone company that owned over 600,000 telephone lines in 12 states prior to its acquisition by CenturyTel.

History
PTI started as a holding company for Ilwaco Telephone and Telegraph. Norman Howerton sought to upgrade the telephone equipment that Ilwaco Telephone had been using. To build capital, he organized Telephone Utilities to attract investors and modernize his telephone network.

As customers began to join IT&T, the company began to expand. In 1966, Telephone Utilities acquired its first company, Gem State Utilities of Idaho. By 1972, it acquired 22 companies that provided telephone service to 60,000 customers in four states. Telephone Utilities also began to consolidate management of its telephone operations into semi-autonomous districts to allow for greater efficiency.

In 1973, Telephone Utilities was acquired by Pacific Power and Light Company of Portland, Oregon. PP&L already owned telephone companies located in Montana and Oregon serving 40,000 customers through its Northwestern Telephone Systems. PP&L's existing telephone operations were placed under control of Telephone Utilities. It continued to grow and acquire small telephone companies and, in the process, upgrading switching facilities. Electronic switching was introduced in Kalispell, Montana in 1975. In 1979, 14 separate telephone companies that Telephone Utilities acquired were merged into Telephone Utilities of Washington.

In 1979, Pacific Power and Light acquired Alascom from RCA. In 1982, Pacific Power and Light placed the two companies into one company called Pacific Telecom, Inc., headquartered in Vancouver, Washington. Pacific Power and Light became PacifiCorp.

Throughout the 1980s, the company diversified into other fields, including cellular telephony, and then laid a Pacific cable to Japan.

Beginning in 1993, U S WEST Communications, a Bell Operating Company, began selling some of its telephone lines to Pacific Telecom. In 1993, Pacific Telecom announced it would acquire 45 exchanges serving 50,000 telephone lines in Colorado from U S WEST. The deal closed in February 1995, becoming a part of PTI's Eagle Telecommunications division. Later that year, Pacific Telecom acquired U S WEST Communications telephone lines in Oregon and Washington, adding 36,000 telephone lines. The transaction closed in October 1995. The sale did not include telephone directories which continued to include PTI companies' listings that were formerly part of U S WEST.

In 1995, Pacific Telecom sold Alascom to AT&T and became known as AT&T Alascom for $365 million.

Sale to CenturyTel
In 1997, PacifiCorp sold PTI to another largely rural carrier, Century Telephone. In 1998, the company's legal name was changed to CenturyTel of the Northwest, Inc. and all of PTI's subsidiaries' corporate names were changed to reflect CenturyTel ownership.

References

Lumen Technologies
Companies based in Vancouver, Washington
1956 establishments in Texas
Telecommunications companies established in 1955
Telecommunications companies of the United States
American companies established in 1955